The Hoppers Crossing Football Club is an Australian rules football club which compete in the WRFL  since 1988. They are based in the Melbourne suburb of Hoppers Crossing.

History
In 1972, the club fielded a senior team in the Western Suburbs FL. In 1981 and 1987 they made the Grand final only to lose both games. They moved across to the Footscray and District FL in 1988 after their previous league closed down. 
After winning the 1992 Division 2 premiership the club was promoted to Division One where they have remained since.

VFL/AFL Players
Nigel Kellett – 
Brad Johnson – 
Daniel Ward – 
Ryan O'Keefe –

Honours
 Western Region Football League
 Division One Seniors Premiers (2): 2002, 2004
 Division One Seniors Runners Up (4): 2001, 2006, 2016, 2018
 
 Division One Reserves Premiers (5): 2006, 2007, 2015, 2016, 2017
 Division One Reserves Runners Up (1): 2011
 
 Division Two Seniors Premiers (1): 1992
 Division Two Seniors Runners Up (1): 1990
 
 Division Two Reserves Premiers (1): 1992
 Division Two Reserves Runners Up (0): -

Bibliography
 History of the WRFL/FDFL by Kevin Hillier – 
 History of football in Melbourne's north west by John Stoward –

References

External links
Official website

Australian rules football clubs in Melbourne
Australian rules football clubs established in 1972
1972 establishments in Australia
Western Region Football League clubs
Sport in the City of Wyndham